= Maria Tchernycheva =

Russian physicist

Maria Tchernycheva (Russian: Мария Чернышева) born in Saint Petersburg, Russia is working in the field of photonics and nanotechnology at both the Universite Paris-Sud XI and Centre national de la recherche scientifique. She has an h-index of 54 with the most cited work being Systematic experimental and theoretical investigation of intersubband absorption in Ga N/ Al N quantum wells which was published in 2006 and received 211 since that year.
